The 1968 Football League Cup Final took place on 2 March 1968 at Wembley Stadium. It was the eighth final and the second to be played at Wembley. It was contested between Arsenal and Leeds United.

Leeds had been Inter-Cities Fairs Cup finalists the previous season, while Arsenal had been a mid-table side of late, and it was their first Wembley appearance since the 1952 FA Cup Final. For both clubs, it was their first League Cup Final. Leeds had conceded just three goals in six matches in their run-up to the final and their defence were on top again in a drab battle for the trophy against Arsenal. Terry Cooper scored the only goal of the game, hammering home a long range goal after 20 minutes. After that, Leeds shut up shop and a defensive performance saw them out for the rest of the match.

It was the first major trophy of Don Revie's reign at Elland Road and started the most successful period in the club's history. Arsenal reached the League Cup Final the following year, only to lose again (this time to Swindon Town), but went on to win both domestic and European trophies in the following seasons.

Match facts

Road to Wembley
Home teams listed first.

Notes

External links
1968 League Cup Final at Live Football
Game facts  at soccerbase.com
Full Results from the 1968 Football League Cup competition at soccerbase.com
League Cup 1968 at The English Football Archive

League Cup Final
League Cup Final
League Cup Final
EFL Cup Finals
League Cup Final 1968
League Cup Final 1968
Football League Cup Final